{{Infobox musical artist
| name                = Los Brujos
| image               = Los Brujos Logo.svg
| caption             = 
| image_size          = 250px
| background          = group_or_band
| origin              = Turdera, Buenos Aires, Argentina
| genre               = {{flatlist|
 Funk metal
 beatcore
 rock
 psychedelic rock}}
| years_active        = 
| label               = 
| website             = Los Brujos.com
| current_members     = 
| past_members        = 
| associated_acts     = 
}}

Los Brujos (formed in 1988) is an Argentine rock band, part of the "New Argentine Rock" scene which became successful in the late 1980s and early 1990s.

 Members 

Gabriel Guerrisi: guitar
Fabio "Rey" Pastrello: 2nd guitar
Alejandro Alaci: voice
Quique Ilid: drums

 Former members 
Ricky Rua: voice (†)
"Gabo" Gabriel Manelli: bass (†)
Sergio Moreno: bass

 Synopsis 

Combining 1960s beat sounds and 1980s hardcore, Los Brujos is an experimental group. In addition, their theatrical performances, where musicians created a special atmosphere around them, made Los Brujos a very visual rock act.

 First discs (1988-1993) 

Los Brujos had a good year in 1992; the single "Kanishka" from the album Fin de Semana Salvaje ("Savage Weekend"), was a chart-topper. Somewhat haphazardly produced by the band in terms of the concept, Daniel Melero, the producer, decided to let the album's sound stand as the disorganized naïveté of an adolescent band. It ranks as one of the best New Argentine rock records.

1993's San Cipriano was another strong performance by the band, which strengthened their status. In the two years following Los Brujos would perform on stage with the likes of Nirvana, Soda Stereo, Babasónicos, and Beastie Boys.

 Guerra de nervios and separation (1995-1998) 

Their third album, 1995's Guerra de Nervios had involved some cool musicians as Gustavo Cerati, Daniel Melero and Aitor of Juana la Loca. It was a disc with an awesome production, reminiscent of the best science fiction films.

After ten years together, Los Brujos announced their separation in 1998. With one of the major bands of the movement gone, their break-up was seen as the end of the New Argentine rock period, and the beginning of the suburban rock dominance of the late 1990s and early 2000s...

 The Return (2014) 

In late 2013 rumors began circulating online about Los Brujos´s reunion. A large group of fans were clamoring for the return of the band for nearly two decades and finally their wishes were fulfilled.
On April 7, 2014 Los Brujos released a new single called "Beat Hit" and announced the release of their new album (Despierta Cronopio) and tour dates. This way, they begin to write a new chapter in the Argentinean sonic psychedelic rock scene.

Ricky Rúa, singer and performer of Los Brujos, died for terminal cancer in 2016.

 Discography 

 1991 - Fin de Semana Salvaje 1993 - San Cipriano 1995 - Guerra de Nervios 2015 - Pong! 2017 - Brujotecnia''

References

External links 
 LosBrujosoficial.com (official page).
 DespiertaCronopio.com.ar (official page).
 Los Brujos - Atlánticos (official page since 1998).
 Volvieron Los Brujos (unofficial fan page by 'n-sonic97')

Argentine rock music groups
Rock en Español music groups
Musical groups established in 1988